Kirchspielslandgemeinde Heider Umland is an Amt ("collective municipality") in the district of Dithmarschen, in Schleswig-Holstein, Germany. It is situated around Heide, which is the seat of the Amt, but not part of it. It was formed on 1 January 2008 from the former Ämter Kirchspielslandgemeinde Heide-Land and Kirchspielslandgemeinde Weddingstedt and the municipality Norderwöhrden.

The Amt Kirchspielslandgemeinde Heider Umland consists of the following municipalities (with population in 2005):

 Hemmingstedt (2.989)
 Lieth (396)
 Lohe-Rickelshof (1.942)
 Neuenkirchen (1.044)
 Norderwöhrden (287)
 Nordhastedt (2.753)
 Ostrohe (963)
 Stelle-Wittenwurth (486)
 Weddingstedt (2.321)
 Wesseln (1.352)
 Wöhrden (1.334)

References

Ämter in Schleswig-Holstein